Richard Williamson is the name of:

Richard Williamson (bishop) (born 1940), formerly of the Society of St. Pius X
Richard Williamson (American football) (1941–2015), retired wide receivers coach
Richard Williamson (sailor) (born 1944), Australian Olympic sailor
Richard T. Williamson (born 1958), non-fiction writer
Ric Williamson (1952–2007), Texas politician
Richard S. Williamson (1949–2013), US special envoy to Sudan and former Chairman of the Illinois Republican Party
Rich Williamson (filmmaker), Canadian film director

See also
Richard Williams (disambiguation)